Northam Senior High School is a comprehensive public co-educational high school, located in Northam, a regional centre in the Wheatbelt region,  east of Perth, Western Australia.

History
The school was established in 1921 and by 2020 had an enrolment of 715 students between Year 7 and Year 12, approximately 12% of whom were Indigenous Australians.

It is the oldest senior high school outside the Perth metropolitan area.

Many of the buildings are heritage listed having been built in 1921, 1930 and 1945. The main school building, designed by the Principal Architect of Western Australia, William Hardwick, and the later additions that followed the original design are considered good examples of the inter-war arts and crafts style.

Enrolments at the school have been reasonably steady with 645 students enrolled in 2007, 663 in 2008, 629 in 2009, 559 in 2010, 608 in 2011 and 604 in 2012.

Notable alumni
 Harry Butler (1930–2015), naturalist and environmental consultant
 John Colebatch (1909–2005), pioneering cancer researcher
 Jerry Ellis, Rhodes Scholar, chairman of BHP, chancellor of Monash University
 Bobby Hill, plays for Greater Western Sydney in the Australian Football League
 Barbara York Main (1929–2019), arachnologist, adjunct professor at the University of Western Australia
 Kenneth Martin, a justice of the Supreme Court of Western Australia
 Nonja Peters, academic
 John Rutherford, Australian Test cricketer
 Sydney Stack, plays for the Richmond Football Club in the Australian Football League
 Shirley Strickland (1925–2004), a world record-holding Olympic athlete
 Jay Watson, musician, singer and songwriter, with Tame Impala and Pond

See also
 
List of schools in rural Western Australia

References

External links
 

Public high schools in Western Australia
Educational institutions established in 1921
Northam, Western Australia
1921 establishments in Australia
State Register of Heritage Places in the Shire of Northam